Grândola is a town (vila) and municipality in Setúbal District in Portugal. The population in 2011 was 14,826, in an area of 825.94 km2.

Included in this municipality is Tróia (part of Carvalhal parish), a peninsula between the Atlantic Ocean and the Sado River. Also within the municipality is Serra de Grândola (Grândola Mountain). The nearest city is Alcácer do Sal. The coastal portions of the municipality are part of the Comporta region.

The municipal holiday is October 22.

Grândola has its own railway station on the main line between Lisbon and Faro. Passenger trains are operated by Comboios de Portugal (CP).

Climate
Grândola has a Mediterranean climate with hot summers and mild wet winters.

Parishes 
Administratively, the municipality is divided into four civil parishes (freguesias):
 Azinheira dos Barros e São Mamede do Sádão 
 Carvalhal
 Melides
 Grândola e Santa Margarida da Serra

Notable inhabitants
 Dinis Vital (1932–2014) a Portuguese football goalkeeper, with upwards of 461 club caps
 Hélder Costa (born 1939 in Grândola) a Portuguese dramatist and playwright

Gallery

See also 
"Grândola, Vila Morena" – a song by José Afonso associated with the Carnation Revolution

References

External links 

 Website of the Municipality of Grândola

 
Towns in Portugal
Populated places in Setúbal District
Populated places established in 1544
Municipalities of Setúbal District
1544 establishments in Portugal